Four-time defending champions Todd Woodbridge and Mark Woodforde defeated Jacco Eltingh and Paul Haarhuis in the final, 7–6(7–4), 7–6(9–7), 5–7, 6–3 to win the gentlemen's doubles tennis title at the 1997 Wimbledon Championships. It was their fifth Wimbledon title and ninth major title overall.

Seeds

  Todd Woodbridge /  Mark Woodforde (champions)
  Jacco Eltingh /  Paul Haarhuis (final)
  Yevgeny Kafelnikov /  Daniel Vacek (first round)
  Mark Knowles /  Daniel Nestor (third round)
  Sébastien Lareau /  Alex O'Brien (first round)
  Ellis Ferreira /  Patrick Galbraith (third round)
  Mark Philippoussis /  Pat Rafter (quarterfinals)
  Rick Leach /  Jonathan Stark (third round)
  Jonas Björkman /  Nicklas Kulti (quarterfinals)
  Sandon Stolle /  Cyril Suk (third round)
  Neil Broad /  Piet Norval (quarterfinals)
  Donald Johnson /  Francisco Montana (quarterfinals)
  Martin Damm /  Pavel Vízner (semifinals)
  Libor Pimek /  Byron Talbot (first round)
  Grant Connell /  Scott Davis (second round)
  Joshua Eagle /  Andrew Florent (first round)

Qualifying

Draw

Finals

Top half

Section 1

Section 2

Bottom half

Section 3

Section 4

References

External links

1997 Wimbledon Championships – Men's draws and results at the International Tennis Federation

Men's Doubles
Wimbledon Championship by year – Men's doubles